Absinthe is a 1914 American silent drama film starring King Baggot and Leah Baird and directed by Herbert Brenon. Some sources also credit George Edwardes-Hall as a director.

Twelve minutes and three seconds of the film, attributed to the EYE Filmmuseum and with Dutch subtitles, can be viewed on YouTube.

Plot
A Parisian artist becomes addicted to the liquor absinthe and sinks to robbery and murder.

Cast
King Baggot as Jean Dumas
Leah Baird as Madame Dumas

References

External links

Absinthe
1914 films
1914 drama films
Silent American drama films
American silent feature films
American black-and-white films
Films directed by Herbert Brenon
Films set in Paris
Films shot in Paris
Universal Pictures films
Films about alcoholism
1910s American films